Omar Ahmed Sodani was "a prominent figure in Muammar Gaddafi's regime" suspected of having murdered PC Yvonne Fletcher outside the Libyan embassy in London in 1984.

References

Year of birth missing (living people)
Living people
Libyan prisoners and detainees
Place of birth missing (living people)